The dune lark (Calendulauda erythrochlamys) is a species of lark in the family Alaudidae. It is endemic to Namibia where its natural habitat is subtropical or tropical dry lowland grassland.

Taxonomy and systematics 
Originally, the dune lark was classified as belonging to the genus Alauda, then later by Mirafra and Certhilauda, until moved to Calendulauda in 2009. Formerly, some authorities considered the dune lark to be a subspecies of the Karoo lark (as Certhilauda albescens erythrochlamys) and Barlow's lark (as Certhilauda erythrochlamys barlowi) to be subspecies of the dune lark. Not all authorities recognize each of these re-classifications.

References

External links

 Species text - The Atlas of Southern African Birds

dune lark
Birds of Southern Africa
dune lark
Taxonomy articles created by Polbot